The 1938–39 Western Kentucky State Teachers Hilltoppers men's basketball team represented Western Kentucky State Normal School and Teachers College (now known as Western Kentucky University) during the 1938-39 NCAA basketball season. The team was led by future Naismith Memorial Basketball Hall of Fame coach Edgar Diddle.  Former All-State player, Ted Hornback returned to his alma mater this season as assistant coach.  He would remain in that position until Diddle's retirement in 1964, when he would be promoted to Athletic Director.  The Hilltoppers won the Kentucky Intercollegiate Athletic Conference and Southern Intercollegiate Athletic Association championships.  All five starters, John Hackett, Harry Saddler, Wilson Stemm, Herb Ball, and Carlisle Towery, were selected to the All-SIAA team.  Hackett, Saddler, and Towery also made the All-KIAC team.

Schedule

|-
!colspan=6| 1939 Kentucky Intercollegiate Athletic Conference Tournament

|-
!colspan=6| 1939 Southern Intercollegiate Athletic Association Tournament

References

Western Kentucky Hilltoppers basketball seasons
Western Kentucky State Teachers
Western Kentucky State Teachers
Western Kentucky State Teachers